Guthrie Senators was the primary name of the minor league baseball teams based in Guthrie, Oklahoma, United States.

History
The Guthrie Senators played in the Western Association (1905, 1909–1910) and South Central League (1906). Later, Guthrie teams played in the Oklahoma State League (1912, 1922–1924) as the Guthrie Spas in 1912. and the Guthrie Linters in 1922 and 1923.  Guthrie also was represented in the Western Association for a brief time during 1914, under the name Guthrie Orphans.

The ballparks
Although the Guthrie ballpark had different names over the years, it was consistently located in what is now known as Mineral Wells Park.

The field used by the 1904 Guthrie Blues was known as the Island Park diamond. Island Park was renamed Mineral Wells Park in 1910. The Island Park athletic field, which later in 1904 hosted the first Bedlam Series football game between Oklahoma A&M University (now Oklahoma State University and the University of Oklahoma, was located just across Cottonwood Creek from the current park gazebo.

Beginning in 1905, Guthrie's ballpark was known as Electric Park. Electric Park was also located immediately across Cottonwood Creek from the “island” portion of Island/Mineral Wells Park. The Guthrie Senators used Electric Park as their home field through 1910.

In 1911, the City of Guthrie purchased Electric Park from the streetcar owners who developed it and consolidated the land, including the ballpark, into Mineral Wells Park. Further amenities were added, including a race track and fairgrounds, around the existing ballpark. Guthrie teams continued to play at the fairgrounds ballpark through the final days of minor league baseball there in 1924.

Notable alumni
Notable players include Red Downs, Eddie Hickey, Tex Jones,  Bill McGill and Clare Patterson. They were managed for part of the 1906 season by Charlie Bennett.

References

Defunct minor league baseball teams
Baseball teams established in 1904
Professional baseball teams in Oklahoma
1904 establishments in Oklahoma Territory
1924 disestablishments in Oklahoma
Baseball teams disestablished in 1924
Guthrie, Oklahoma
Defunct baseball teams in Oklahoma
Defunct Western Association teams